The following is a list of speakers of the North Dakota House of Representatives, a position that was created with the state's constitution in 1889. The term indicated is the year of the legislative session in which the individual served as speaker. It is customary for the Speaker to serve for only one session. The Speaker is chosen from the party that has the majority in the given session.

Notes

External links
State of North Dakota official website

Government of North Dakota

Speakers
North Dakota